Yalınca is a village in the Beşiri District of Batman Province in Turkey. The village had a population of 54 in 2021.

The hamlets of Çimenli, Ortaköy, Sapanlı and Tatlıca are attached to the village.

References 

Villages in Beşiri District
Kurdish settlements in Batman Province